Kathy Martin is a global authority on arctic and alpine grouse and ptarmigan, and on tree cavity-nesting vertebrates. She is a professor in the Faculty of Forestry at the University of British Columbia and a senior research scientist with Environment and Climate Change Canada.

Martin, who trained in ornithology, is currently President (April 2018-August 2020) of the American Ornithological Society. Over three decades, Martin has been a leader in Canada's Conservation Biology research and higher education community, serving on national and international government and society committees. Her leadership activities include representing Canada since 1996 on the International Union for Conservation of Nature IUCN Species Survival Commission for grouse (galliformes). In this capacity she organizes conferences, and both leads and contributes to the writing of syntheses and policy documents. During the 2000s, she served on the council of the American Ornithologists Union (2003–07), chaired the Natural Sciences and Engineering Research Council Ecology and Evolution Grant Committee.

At the national level, Martin participated in early discussions around the formation of the Canadian Society for Ecology and Evolution in 2006, and was a founding member of the organization, later served on its Governing Council (2008-11). In 1996, Martin and her colleagues received The Wildlife Society's Wildlife Publication award, for their paper "Impact of food and predation on the snowshoe hare cycle." In 1992, when she was an assistant professor at the University of Toronto, Scarborough College, Martin developed and taught one of the first courses in Conservation Biology in Canada: C65S.

As of 2017, Martin continues to direct two ongoing, long-term research programs that she founded in Canada. The first, on the life history variation and ecology of alpine birds, began in 1980 and has expanded to sites in Australia, while the second, examining the structure and function of cavity-nesting vertebrate communities, commenced in 1995 and expanded to other sites across North and South America.

Martin has published over 200 papers and book chapters, and has supervised international graduate students and post-doctoral fellows, who have gone on to drive wildlife conservation policy and management in their countries.

Early academic and natural history career
Kathy Martin is a native of Prince Edward Island, Canada. Her undergraduate degree in Biology was from the University of Prince Edward Island (1970). This was followed by an MSc at the University of Alberta, Edmonton (1973), and a PhD at Queen's University, Kingston (1985), with geneticist Dr. Fred Cooke. Cooke founded one of the longest-running field ecology studies in the world, examining the genetics and population biology of lesser snow geese. Martin's doctoral research was on Willow Ptarmigan population biology, and not on Lesser Snow Geese, although she has done research on snow geese. Following the completion of her doctorate, Martin received a Natural Sciences and Engineering Research Council of Canada post-doctoral fellowship at the University of Alberta (1985–1988).

Early on in her career, prior to undertaking her doctoral research, Martin committed to doing what is now popularly known as public science and science communication. Martin was active in the Prince Edward Island Natural History society, founding and editing the first 40 copies of its newsletter. In 1977, she wrote the guide Island Woodland Plants.

In 1981, Martin published the monograph Watershed Red, about the natural history of the Dunk River Watershed.

Research career
Martin's first faculty position was as an assistant professor at the Université de Sherbrooke (1988–89) followed by an NSERC University Research Fellow and assistant professor position in life sciences at the University of Toronto Scarborough campus (1989–1992). In 1993, she moved to Vancouver to assume her current joint appointment with the Faculty of Forestry at the University of British Columbia and Environment and Climate Change Canada.

As of 2020, Martin has supervised 35 post-graduate students and over 20 post-doctoral fellows, a number of whom have gone on to become university professors, including: Kristina Cockle, Adjunct University of British Columbia, Brad Fedy, University of Waterloo; Stephanie Melles, Ryerson University and Len Thomas, University of St Andrews.

Academic leadership positions

Current
 American Ornithological Society, president, 2018-20
 American Ornithological Society, president elect, 2016-18
 Bird Studies Canada Scientific Advisory Board, since 2010
 International Ornithologists' Union, Canadian delegate, since 2010
 IUCN/ICBP (The World Conservation Union) Specialist Group for Galliformes; Canadian representative, since 1996

Past
 International Ornithological Union, Scientific Program Committee, January 2015
 North American Ornithological Conference, Vancouver, chair, 2012
 Canadian Society for Ecology and Evolution, founding board member, 2008–2011
 Natural Sciences and Engineering Research Council Grant Selection Committee – Evolution and Ecology chair 2003–04
 Society of Canadian Ornithologists, president, 2000–02

Awards 
 2018 Godman-Salvin Medal, from the British Ornithologists' Union, which is awarded "to an individual as a signal honour for distinguished ornithological work."
 2016 Canadian Section of The Wildlife Society's Ian McTaggart-Cowan Lifetime Achievement Award.
 2008 Doris Huestis Speirs Award, for Outstanding Lifetime Contributions to Canadian Ornithology.
 2003 the 5NR Science Award to Leaders in Sustainable Development, Natural Resources, Canada.

References

Major Publications 
Boyle WA, Martin K. 2015. The conservation value of high elevation habitats to North American migrant birds. Biol Conserv. 192: 461–476. https://doi.org/10.1016/j.biocon.2015.10.008
Cockle, KL, Martin K, Wesolowski, T. 2011. Woodpeckers, decay and the future of cavity-nesting vertebrate communities worldwide. Front Ecol Environ. 9: 377–382. https://doi.org/10.1890/110013
Jackson MM, Gergel SE, Martin K. 2015. Citizen science and field survey observations provide comparable results for mapping Vancouver Island White-tailed Ptarmigan (Lagopus leucura saxatilis) distributions. Biol Conserv. 181: 162–172. https://doi.org/10.1016/j.biocon.2014.11.010
Martin K. 1977. Island woodland plants. Charlottetown (PEI): Dept. Environment. 74 p. [reprinted 1983 and 2008 available at: https://www.princeedwardisland.ca/sites/default/files/publications/pei_woodland_plants.pdf].
Martin K. 1981. Watershed Red: The life of the Dunk River, Prince Edward Island. Charlottetown (PEI): Ragweed Press. 155p.
Martin K, Aitken KEH, Wiebe KL. 2004. Nest sites and nest webs for cavity-nesting communities in interior British Columbia, Canada: nest characteristics and niche partitioning. Condor. 106: 5-19. https://doi.org/10.1650/7482
Martin K, Wiebe KL. 2004. Coping mechanisms of alpine and arctic breeding birds: extreme weather and limitations to reproductive resilience. Integr Comp Biol. 44: 177–185. https://doi.org/10.1093/icb/44.2.177
Sandercock BK, Martin K, Segelbacher G, editors. 2011. Ecology, conservation and management of grouse. Studies in Avian Biology. Berkeley (CA): University of California Press. 378 p.
Van der Hoek Y, Gaona, GV, Martin K. 2017. The diversity, distribution and conservation status of the tree-cavity nesting birds of the world. Divers Distrib. 23: 1120–1131. https://doi.org/10.1111/ddi.12601

Academic staff of the University of British Columbia
Canadian women scientists
Canadian ornithologists